Gösta Bernhard Svensson (21 November 1929 – 14 October 2018) was a Swedish high jumper. He competed at the 1950 European Athletics Championships and 1952 Summer Olympics and finished in fifth and fourth place, respectively. In 1952 he set a new national record at 2.02 m.

References

1929 births
2018 deaths
Swedish male high jumpers
Olympic athletes of Sweden
Athletes (track and field) at the 1952 Summer Olympics
People from Karlshamn
Sportspeople from Blekinge County
20th-century Swedish people